Juan Acosta may refer to:

 Juan Acosta (athlete) (1907–?), Chilean long-distance runner
 Juan Acosta (footballer) (born 1993), Uruguayan footballer
 Juan F. Acosta (1890–1968), Puerto Rican composer and music teacher
 Juan Becerra Acosta (born 1973), Mexican journalist